Mogens Daniel Guldberg (born 2 August 1963 in Kalundborg) is a former middle distance runner from Denmark, who represented his native country at the 1988 Summer Olympics in Seoul, South Korea. There he was eliminated in the semifinals of the 1500 metres. He represented Sparta.

He finished twelfth at the 1990 European Championships. Over 3000 metres at the IAAF World Indoor Championships he finished eighth in 1987, fourth in 1991 and fifth in 1993. He is a one-time national champion (1995) in the men's 5,000 metres.

International competitions

References

1963 births
Living people
People from Kalundborg
Danish male middle-distance runners
Danish male long-distance runners
Olympic male middle-distance runners
Olympic athletes of Denmark
Athletes (track and field) at the 1988 Summer Olympics
Japan Championships in Athletics winners
Sportspeople from Region Zealand
20th-century Danish people